The Shenzhen International was a European Tour golf tournament played from 2015 to 2017 in China. The inaugural tournament was played from 16–19 April 2015 at the Genzon Golf Club, in Shenzhen.

Winners

References

External links
Coverage on the European Tour's official site

Former European Tour events
Golf tournaments in China
Sports competitions in Guangdong
Sport in Shenzhen
Recurring sporting events established in 2015
Recurring sporting events disestablished in 2017
2015 establishments in China
2017 disestablishments in China